Blitz: The League II is an American football video game developed Midway Games as part of its  NFL Blitz series. It is a sequel to Blitz: The League. It was released on the PlayStation 3 and Xbox 360 on October 13, 2008. There are five new teams included in this installment: The Los Angeles Riot, the Houston Riders, Vancouver Beavers, Milwaukee Hounds, and Atlanta 404; and four older teams have been relocated. Lawrence Taylor (L.T.) is featured in the game, reprising his role as Quentin Sands.

The game also alludes to real-life scandals involving NFL players, as former Washington Redhawks quarterback Mike Mexico is now serving time in prison. This situation is similar to that of Michael Vick, who used the pseudonym "Ron Mexico" when seeking treatment for herpes, as well as Vick's conviction for running an illegal dogfighting ring. There are also allegations of the New England Regulars cheating in a championship game, a reference to the New England Patriots' "Spygate" scandal. The game also features an incident with the Minnesota Reapers, reminiscent of the Minnesota Vikings boat scandal.

Story

The game starts off during the league expansion. Two teams are joining the league. The first team is the player-created team, in which the player may choose the city, team name, and team colors. The second team is the Los Angeles Riot. This team is the main rival team in the campaign mode, and is led by Bruno Battaglia, the former player from the player-created team in Blitz: The League. The Riot are the commissioner Clive Hanson's pet project, as he desires to have them win the championship in the future. He has fortified this by having the Riot start in Division 2 and stocking up the team with star players.

The only player left to add to the Riot is the projected #1 draft pick Kid Franchise. But Franchise surprises the entire league when he announces that he will be playing for his home team, and only his home team (the player-created team). This puts Franchise on the commissioner's bad side, and immediately creates a rivalry between the player-created team and the L.A. Riot. Franchise is the only player in the league to play both on offense and defense. During a pre-season interview, Franchise is asked nine questions that will determine his position on both sides of the ball and his player attributes. Each answer gives higher attributes early on in the campaign.

Division 3
Because there are a lot of teams, the game will take place over 3 seasons (a season per division). The commissioner notices that he will need help to put away the player-created team so the Riot have an easy Championship victory, so he tells New York Nightmare LB star, Quentin Sands, to destroy any hope for the player-created team of advancing. After Game 2, Quentin Sands joins the player-created team. The team must win at least 5 out of 7 division games to reach the Division 3 championship. The player-created team plays the Milwaukee Hounds and Conrad Damon at the division championship. After the win, a cutscene will be played, in which Quentin Sands is seen spiking Franchise's drink.

Division 2
Before the start of Division 2, Franchise is put in the Milltown Correctional Facility because he "violated" the league's drug policy. Luckily, Milltown plays football as well. The warden tells Franchise that if he can lead Milltown to a win against the rival Super Max Facility in their annual football game (without getting injured), he will be released early. After defeating Super Max, Franchise returns to play for the player-created team preparing for their season in Division 2. The player-created team is allowed to draft one team captain from Division 3 to play for them in Division 2. The Riot have made upgrades as well by adding Cleveland Steamers WR Justin Jonas (who was also a rookie from the first Blitz game) to the team. During a cut-scene, Riot captain Bruno Battaglia informs Franchise that Quentin Sands spiked his drink and sent him to Milltown. This results in a fight between Sands and Franchise, and a feud that lasts throughout Division 2.

Once again, the player must win 5 out of 7 division games to enter the Division 2 championship. Surprisingly, the Riot do not make it, and instead the Miami Hammerheads make it through MVP Julius Williams (unless Franchise wins the MVP). After the win, it is revealed that seven Minnesota Reapers players were killed in a boat crash, leading the team to fold. Therefore, another team besides the player-created team must advance into Division 1. And in a "random" drawing in the commissioner's office, the L.A. Riot will be the second team to advance into Division 1.

Division 1
During the off-season, Karl Tirpitz, who played as captain for Super Max, joins the player-created team. The L.A. Riot, despite the controversial advance into Division 1, are favored to win the championship. They have added Washington Redhawks captain (and rookie QB from the first Blitz game) Clayton Wescott, Kelvin Diggs and Tyrell Price of the Kansas City Crossfire, Justin Jonas of the Cleveland Steamers and Kimo Talofa of the Atlanta 404. Once again, the player needs to win 5 out of 7 games to reach the League championship. The Riot, however, go undefeated (unless they are defeated by the player-created team).

During division play, the player-created team will face off with the New York Nightmare, Quentin Sands' former team. Before the game is played, Sands tells Franchise to forget what happened between them and work together to defeat his former team and win the league championship against the Riot. Franchise and Sands decide that they will also get back at the corrupt commissioner. Sands offers the commissioner to give him the captain spot on the L.A. Riot if he tells him important information (which is fake). The information is that Franchise has an injured Achilles tendon and will not be the same player on game day. The commissioner agrees and tells the other men in the room to buy stock on the Riot. Sands, however, records the entire conversation outside of the office.

After the player-created team defeats the L.A. Riot in the League championship, the commissioner is arrested for insider trading, money laundering and extortion, thus ending the season for the player-created team going from Division 3 to Division 1 and getting the League Championship.

Reception

The game received "mixed or average reviews" on both platforms according to the review aggregation website Metacritic.

References

External links

2008 video games
American football video games
Midway video games
NFL Blitz video games
PlayStation 3 games
RenderWare games
Video games developed in the United States
Xbox 360 games